Gary Hrivnak (born March 3, 1951) is a former American football defensive end. He played for the Chicago Bears from 1973 to 1975.

References

1951 births
Living people
American football defensive ends
Purdue Boilermakers football players
Chicago Bears players